The Hammarlund Super Pro was an American-made radio communications receiver.

History 
In March 1936, the Hammarlund Manufacturing Company initiated the first of the famous "Super-Pro" line, the SP-10 receiver, followed in January 1937 by the SP-100. Their efforts to improve the design resulted in October 1939 with the SP-200 series, an 18-tube, single conversion superhet receiver. The SP-200 series Super-Pro receivers were manufactured through 1945, with thousands delivered to the military during World War II; they saw wide use by the U.S. Signal Corps as the BC-779. During World War II, government agencies like the FBI used the 200 Series Super-Pro at their listening posts.  Many were used at ground stations in England to communicate with the Royal Air Force and U.S. Air Force armadas that flew bombing missions over Germany. According to a November 1940 QST Magazine ad, "The fact that 'Super-Pro' receivers are used extensively by the U.S. Signal Corps and many other governmental departments, speaks for itself." At the end of the war, the market was flooded with surplus Super-Pro receivers at bargain prices, which may be a reason many working examples of this model are still found today. From 1946 to 1948, Hammarlund produced the SP-400 Super Pro for the amateur radio market. In 1947 the SP-600 Super-Pro receiver, which surpassed the SP-200 in performance, was introduced. The SP-600 series were widely used throughout the world for military, laboratory and commercial application.

Specifications

SP-200 

Various models of the SP-200 series cover 0.1–40 MHz in 5 bands. The radio and cabinet weigh 73 pounds (33 kg) while the separate power supply adds another 57 to 61 pounds. The Super-Pro was first offered in two basic models, with and without a crystal filter.

SP-400 

The SP-400 Super Pros were very similar to the SP-200's with the differences being mainly cosmetic. They were only made from 1946 to 1948 and had outboard power supplies like the earlier Super Pros. There were two of them, the SP-400-X which tuned from .54 to 30 MHz, and the SP-400-SX which tuned from 1.25–40 MHz.

SP-600 

The SP-600 Super Pro covered the frequency range of 540 kHz to 54 MHz.

 SP-600-J omitted optional crystal control of selected frequencies.
 SP-600-JLX-2,15 and 23 covered .1–.4, 1.35–29.7 MHz.
 SP-600-JX-17, 30 were for diversity reception use.
 SP-600-VLF-31, 38 was limited to 10–540 kHz.
 SP-600-JX-21A had 22 tubes and featured SSB reception.
 SP-600-JLX-27 covered 0.2–0.4 and 0.54–29.7 MHz.
 SP-600-JX-28 was R-620.
 SP-600-JX-6 was R-274B.
 SP-600-JX-12 was R-274A.
 SP-600-JX-29 was produced for the CIA.
 SP-600-JX-39 was produced for the FAA.

See also 
ARC-5
BC-348
BC-611
ART 13 transmitter
Collins Radio
Hammarlund
National HRO
R-390A
Vintage amateur radio
Wireless Set No. 19

References

General references 
War Department Technical Manual TM11-866, 31 August 1943 Radio Receivers BC-779-B, BC-794-B, and BC-1004-C and Power Supply Units RA-74-C, RA-84-B, and RA-94-A
Instruction Book for "Super-Pro" Radio Receiver (100-400 kc and 2.5-20 Mc), overprinted Radio Receiver BC-779-A and Power Supply Unit RA-84-A, Undated, Published by Authority of The Chief Signal Officer, Order No. 21109
Series 200 Super-Pro by Hammarlund, undated.
Communications Receivers, The Vacuum Tube Era 1932-1981, 3rd Edition, by Raymond S. Moore

External links
The incredible pre-war Super Pro, Western Historic Radio Museum

Amateur radio receivers
Military radio systems
World War II American electronics
Equipment of the United States Air Force